Usama Mir (born 23 December 1995) is a Pakistani cricketer who's a leg spinner plays for Central Punjab in domestic cricket and for the Multan Sultans in Pakistan Super League.

Domestic career
Mir has played for Khan Research Laboratories from 2013 to 2015 seasons and remained as wicket-taking option for his captain. 
He was the leading wicket taker during the 2015 edition of the Haier Super 8 T20 Cup.
In 2017, Mir played for Karachi Kings in PSL. 
He was also the part of the Pakistan team which ended as runners up to Sri Lanka in the 2017 ACC Emerging Team Cup. During that tournament he finished as the leading wicket-taker with 13 dismissals.
In April 2018, he was named in Punjab's squad for the 2018 Pakistan Cup. He took the most wickets for Punjab during the tournament, with six dismissals in four matches.
On 3 June 2018, he was selected to play for the Toronto Nationals in the players' draft for the inaugural edition of the Global T20 Canada tournament.

International career
Mir made his ODI debut against New Zealand in January 2023. He took his first wicket of Kane Williamson and went on to take two wickets in total in that match.

References

External links
 

1995 births
Living people
Khan Research Laboratories cricketers
Pakistani cricketers
Cricketers from Sialkot
Sialkot Stallions cricketers
Pakistani people of Kashmiri descent
Sindh cricketers
Karachi Kings cricketers
Rajshahi Royals cricketers
St Kitts and Nevis Patriots cricketers